Sylvan is a Spanish animated series produced by D'Ocon Films and created by Antoni D'Ocon

The show centers on the character, Sylvan and his heroic fantasy adventures in the Middle Ages. Sylvan is a swordsman hero of King Charles, who defends and protects the kingdom from the evil forces.

Characters
Sylvan - A ginger fox with a tuft of blonde hair, who wears a red tunic with yellow lining and a Phrygian cap.
Evila - A grey goat with who wears a black dress and veil. An antagonist who makes use of witchcraft.
King Charles - An African lion who wears an aqua suit, with a brass buckle leather belt and traditional king's cloak.
Captain Darkness / Tenebres - A boar who wears a black suit of armour and a cape.
The Death Warrior - A champion in a suit of armour with a frogman-styled visor.
Princess Diana - An African lioness who wears a cream-coloured dress and a pink veil. She is Sylvan's love interest.
Linmer - A magician who wears a purple hat with a jewel and purple robes.
The Prior - A mouse who wears a monk outfit and sandals.
Count Greedo - A pig with a black beard.
Fidel - A tiger who wears a armor and helmet

External links
 Website

See also

The Legend of Zelda
Johan and Peewit
Robin Hood (1973 film)
Furrlough

1990s animated television series
Australian Broadcasting Corporation original programming
Catalan television programmes
Spanish children's animated adventure television series
Spanish children's animated fantasy television series
Animated television series about foxes
Television series set in the Middle Ages
Fantasy franchises